Hassel Iron Works (also rendered as Hassel jernverk in modern spelling) was a former mining  and iron works company located near the village of Skotselv in Øvre Eiker, Buskerud, Norway, that existed from 1649 until 1854.

Hassel Iron Works received a royal privilege from King Frederick III of Denmark and Norway in 1649. The mines was in production until  1854, when the company was dissolved and its properties auctioned off. However some limited operations continued until the 1870s under new owners. Its most important mines were located at Hassel in Modum and Barbu near Arendal. The operation included a smelter with a large blast furnace. A large water wheel was used to drive the blower in the blast furnace. Hassel Iron Works also received ore from neighboring mines at Sveaas and Skredsvik in Modum, at Holtefjell, Dramdal and Såsen in Øvre Eiker and from Solberg and Åserud in Nedre Eiker.

References

Other sources
Berg, Ole Jan Hassel Jernverk. Driften og privilegiene 1649–1816 (Eiker trykkeri AS, Hokksund)

Related Reading
Vogt, Johan Herman Lie (1908) De gamle norske jernverk  (H. Aschehoug & Company)

Defunct companies of Norway
Mining companies of Norway
Iron ore mining companies
Øvre Eiker
Modum
Arendal
1649 establishments in Norway
Metal companies of Norway